Damascus  is a census-designated place and once-disincorporated city in Clackamas County, Oregon, United States. Established in 1867, it was incorporated in 2004 in an effort to enable local land use decision-making control by the community.  It was disincorporated July 18, 2016 under a special Oregon Legislature-directed election process where a majority of those voting voted for the dissolution of the city on May 17, 2016. This vote was found to be against statute and was overturned by the Oregon Court of Appeals on May 1, 2019.  Damascus is located east of Happy Valley and Interstate 205 and west of Boring. The area that later became the city had a population of 9,022 in 2000. The population was 10,539 residents as of the 2010 census.

History
According to Oregon Geographic Names, Damascus can date its existence as a community back to 1867, when a post office by that name was established.  That post office was closed in 1904. The original heart of the community is along Oregon Route 212, which as of 2004 served as part of the city's southern boundary.

A 2000 decision by Metro to expand Portland's urban growth boundary into the area prompted some citizens of the community to submit Measure 3-138, a measure on the ballot for the 2004 general election in November.  The initiative's passage resulted in the incorporation of the former unincorporated communities of Damascus and Carver into the City of Damascus, a step which prevents nearby cities from annexing the community. The city was the first new city in Oregon in 22 years.

In a special election on September 21, 2005, a city charter was approved by 88% of its voters. Voters in eleven parcels of land between Damascus and Happy Valley were given the chance to vote on annexation to Damascus: six of the areas voted for annexation, four voted against, and in the eleventh no votes were cast.

During a primary election in 2016 voters chose to disincorporate, shutting the City down and transferring assets to Clackamas County. The disincorporation vote was later nullified by a 2019 Appeal Court decision on May 1. The court held that the voter turnout did not reach the State's fifty percent threshold and therefore should have been invalidated back in 2016.  On September 3, 2020 the Oregon Supreme Court upheld State legislation that ratified the 2016 disincorporation vote.  As a result, the City of Damascus was deemed disincorporated in July, 2016 and no longer exists as a municipal corporation.

Geography
Located in north-central part of Clackamas County, the former city's northern boundary was the Multnomah County line. Boring lies to the east, and Clackamas to the west.

Demographics

2010 census
As of the census of 2010, there were 10,539 people, 3,621 households, and 2,984 families residing in the city. The racial makeup of the city was 91.3% White, 0.6% African American, 0.6% Native American, 3.4% Asian, 0.2% Pacific Islander, 1.2% from other races, and 2.6% from two or more races. Hispanic or Latino of any race were 4.4% of the population.

There were 3,621 households, of which 36.7% had children under the age of 18 living with them, 72.5% were married couples living together, 6.2% had a female householder with no husband present, 3.8% had a male householder with no wife present, and 17.6% were non-families. 12.5% of all households were made up of individuals, and 4.6% had someone living alone who was 65 years of age or older. The average household size was 2.90 and the average family size was 3.16.

The median age in the city was 43.2 years. 25% of residents were under the age of 18; 6.8% were between the ages of 18 and 24; 20.6% were from 25 to 44; 34.2% were from 45 to 64; and 13.3% were 65 years of age or older. The gender makeup of the city was 50.8% male and 49.2% female.

Government
Fire protection in the Damascus is provided by Clackamas County Fire District #1 (CCFD1). One fire station, Fire Station 19 - Damascus, is located in the community, with emergency response also from nearby CCFD1 Station 7 - Pleasant Valley and CCFD1 Fire Station 14 - Boring. Damascus is served by the North Clackamas, Oregon Trail, Estacada, Centennial, and Gresham-Barlow school districts. The latter is the second-largest employer in the community.

Controversy
As a city, Damascus went through seven city managers in eight years, and generally had a contentious existence as a municipality. This included a vote to disincorporate the city and to recall the mayor in 2013. In the May 17, 2016 primary, the citizens of Damascus voted a second time on a proposal to disincorporate. This time, the proposal was approved, and the city ostensibly ceased to exist on July 18, 2016. However, the disincorporation was nullified by the Oregon Appellate Court on May 1, 2019.  On September 3, 2020, the Oregon Supreme Court reinstated the disincorporation vote of May, 2016 and the city no longer exists.  What was once the City of Damascus is now unincorporated territory in Clackamas County.

References

External links

ITEMIZED MEASURE LISTINGS: May 17, 2016, Majority yes vote disincorporates City of Damascus from the Oregon Blue Book
 Damascas Community Planning Organization

Former cities in Oregon
Unincorporated communities in Clackamas County, Oregon
Portland metropolitan area
1867 establishments in Oregon
Populated places established in 1867
Unincorporated communities in Oregon
Populated places disestablished in 2016